PB-47 Pishin-I ( is a constituency of the Provincial Assembly of Balochistan.

General elections 2013

General elections 2008

See also

 PB-46 Pishin-cum-Karezat
 PB-48 Pishin-II

References

External links
 Election commission Pakistan's official website
 Awazoday.com check result
 Balochistan's Assembly official site

Constituencies of Balochistan